Carmo Dalla Vecchia (born 21 August 1971) is a Brazilian actor.

Biography
Carmo Dalla Vecchia was born in Carazinho, in the Brazilian state of Rio Grande do Sul. He is of Italian descent. He holds Italian citizenship through his grandparents.

Filmography

References

External links

1971 births
Living people
Brazilian male film actors
Brazilian male telenovela actors
20th-century Brazilian male actors
21st-century Brazilian male actors
People from Rio Grande do Sul
Brazilian people of Italian descent
Converts to Sōka Gakkai 
Members of Sōka Gakkai
Nichiren Buddhists
Brazilian Buddhists
Brazilian LGBT actors